Lau Chi-pang,  is a Hong Kong academic and politician serving as an associate vice president at the Lingnan University. In 2021, he was elected as one of the 40 Legislative Council members for the Election Committee constituency which was newly created under the electoral overhaul imposed by Beijing.

Lau was criticized by Chinese state media for appearing in a video where he praised the Hong Kong Golf Club. Lau said that "If public housing is built on the golf course, it will become a political monument," and if that were to happen, housing advocates would then "then aim at other private clubs."

Electoral history

References 

Living people
1960 births
HK LegCo Members 2022–2025
Members of the Election Committee of Hong Kong, 2021–2026
Hong Kong pro-Beijing politicians